Anwaruddin Choudhury, M.A., Ph.D., D.Sc., is an Indian naturalist, noted for his expertise on the fauna of North-East India.

Choudhury is an ornithologist, mammalogist, artist, civil servant, photographer and author. He is recognized by many as an eminent naturalist and conservationist studying wildlife throughout North-East India and adjacent areas. He is the Honorary Chief Executive of the Rhino Foundation for nature in North East India and was Deputy Commissioner (District Magistrate) of Baksa and Lakhimpur districts in Assam and also served as Secretary with the government of Assam. He retired as Divisional Commissioner of Barak valley, Development Commissioner for Hill Areas and Commissioner & Secretary to the Government of Assam in August 2019. Known as the "Birdman of Assam", he was the first to produce books on the birds of different northeastern states including Assam, Arunachal Pradesh, Nagaland, Mizoram and Meghalaya. His studies have contributed enormously to the conservation and awareness in North-East India.
He is the author of 28 books and more than 900 articles and scientific papers. His first article, which was on birds was published in 1977.
Dr Choudhury is recognised as one of India's well known wildlife experts and conservationists. In particular he has spent four decades following the fortunes of North-East India's wildlife.

Biography

Early and service life
Born in Shillong, Meghalaya in 1959 to Alauddin Choudhury and Hena Mazumder, oldest of the four siblings Shahida, Afsar and Akhtar, Choudhury had his schooling in Public High School, Hailakandi (1967), Government Boys High School at Mawkhar, Shillong (1967-1970) and Government Victoria Memorial High School, Hailakandi from where he passed matriculation in second division in 1974. He initially studied science in college but received his Bachelor of Arts degree with Honours in Geography from the B.Borooah College, Guwahati by securing 1st class 1st position in 1981, and went on to Gauhati University to obtain his Master of Arts degree in geography in 1985, also securing 1st class 1st position and gold medal. He obtained his PhD on primates of Assam in 1989 under the guidance of Prof. Dr Mohammed Taher. He became only the second person to get a DSc from Gauhati University, which was on systematic review of mammals of North-east India in 2008.
He married Bilkis Begum Mazumdar in 1994. A daughter, Dona, and a son, Dino, were born. His maternal grandfather Abdul Matlib Mazumder was a noted freedom fighter and was Cabinet Minister in Assam from 1946 to 1970 (with some gap).
Choudhury took up interest in wildlife since unknown childhood and continued with his love of wildlife and nature conservation.

From 1983, Choudhury is an Assam Civil Service officer (subsequently inducted to Indian Administrative Service w.e.f. 1999) holding various important posts such as EAC, Executive Magistrate, Research Officer, Sub-divisional Officer (civil), Additional Deputy Commissioner with temporary charges of District Transport Officer and Chief Executive of Fish Farmers Development, Project Director of Rural Development, Project Coordinator of Shifting Cultivation control, Joint Secretary of Environment & Forests, Tourism; Director of Tea, Managing Director of Assam Financial Corporation and Assam Conductors & Tubes, Secretary of the State Election Commission, Deputy Commissioner & District Magistrate, Secretary to the Government of Assam, Development Commissioner, Divisional Commissioner, and Commissioner & Secretary to the Government of Assam. The departments he worked as Deputy Secretary to Commissioner & Secretary included Cooperation, Environment & Forest, Tourism, Parliamentary Affairs, Secretariat Administration, Hill Areas, Handloom , Textiles & Sericulture, and Mines & Minerals. Besides Barak Valley, he also held temporary charges of Divisional Commissioner of North Assam, Lower Assam and Central Assam. He was also empaneled for the post of Vice Chancellor twice. During his service career as a bureaucrat he was posted in different districts of Assam such as undivided Kamrup, Sivasagar, Lakhimpur, Karbi Anglong, Tinsukia and Baksa. Coincidentally he held some of the founder positions, which no civil servant can predict or are very rare. These were:

 first Sub-divisional Officer (civil) of Dhakuakhana Subdivision in 1989
 first Project Director of Rural Development of Tinsukia district in 1992
 first Deputy Commissioner of Baksa district in 2004
 first Divisional Commissioner of Barak Valley in 2016 (when Hill Areas was separated)

Success in art
He has artistic talent, which; however, was not inherited from anybody. He had his first exhibition in Guwahati in 1975 that was held jointly with noted artists Manabendra Baruah and Ajan Barua. Choudhury has published his artworks in various Indian and international journals, magazines and periodicals including a cover of the Oriental Bird Club Bulletin published from U.K. He has also profusely illustrated his books with his art work.

Ornithology
Casual bird watching took a serious scientific approach in the early 1980s. Choudhury pioneered long-term ornithological works in North-East India, which is nearly five decades old. He started writing for popular magazines and started a regular weekly column as ‘Birds of Assam’ in an English daily The Sentinel published from Guwahati. The publications in local newspapers in 1980s brought him recognition in the field of ornithology across Assam but his writings in international scientific journals and his books brought him recognition in the field of ornithology far and wide.
Choudhury undertook systematic bird surveys in different pockets of North East India.
He rediscovered a rare galliform species, Manipur bush quail in Assam after its last record 75 years ago. He has made several new country records for India and Bhutan. He was Coordinator of Asian Mid-winter Waterfowl Census for Assam and is also coordinator for the North East India. He is also the State Coordinator of the Indian Bird Conservation Network.

He has done pioneering path-breaking studies on the endangered White-winged wood duck and Mrs Hume's pheasant,  which revealed their accurate range and status in India. He also campaigned for conservation of migratory Amur Falcons in Assam from 1994 onwards, Manipur in 2001 and in Nagaland in 2004. He carried out detailed monitoring of roosting population of this falcon in 2017–19 in Karbi Anglong, which revealed lot of new information on the species including annual fluctuation of population.

Mammal research
Dr Choudhury pioneered long-term primate research in North-East India since mid-1980s, nearly four decades ago. In 1986, he traveled to North Cachar Hills (renamed Dima Hasao district) to start a two-decade long research on primates that covered the entire North-East India in later years. Little was known about the life of these simians in the wild until he started his writings on them. He has made several country records for India and Bhutan. But the most significant are discovery and description of three flying squirrels, new to science in 2007, 2009 and 2013. The tree new flying squirrel species that were described by Choudhury in 2007–2013 are:

 Mechuka giant flying squirrel, Petaurista mechukaensis Choudhury, 2007 (type locality: Mechuka)
 Mishmi giant flying squirrel, Petaurista mishmiensis Choudhury, 2009 (type locality: Mishmi Hills)
 Mebo giant flying squirrel, Petaurista siangensis Choudhury, 2013 (type locality: Upper Siang District)

The holotypes of these flying squirrel species are in the collection of the Zoological Survey of India, Kolkata.

He also discovered a new species of primate but identified it as a subspecies of Macaca thibetana. This was later on described by other scientists as Macaca munzala. Recently he described a new subspecies of hoolock gibbon. This has been named by him Hoolock hoolock mishmiensis. Describing new species and subspecies of mammals in the 21st century is undoubtedly very significant. He also revealed for the first time that the stump-tailed and pig-tailed macaques are restricted by the Brahmaputra towards west of their range. His authoritative works on the wild water buffalo have been published recently as the first monograph on this endangered species. His 432-page The Mammals of North East India which was launched in 2013 is the most comprehensive and authoritative such work on any part of India.
Dr Choudhury's observations on capped langur revealed hitherto unrecorded differences in facial hair patterns (especially the cap) that differentiate the three subspecies, which was earlier based upon colour variations. The hair patterns have been found to be more dependable than color patterns.

The Rhino Foundation
He is the founder Chief Executive of the Rhino Foundation for nature in North East India, a leading NGO of India since 1995. This NGO was founded by some leading tea companies and its founder Chairperson was Mrs Anne Wright, MBE. Prof. Dr Anil Kumar Goswami, a leading scientist of Assam is its current Chairperson. His pioneering work in conservation also contributed greatly to the awareness in North East India. His stewardship of the Rhino Foundation for nature in North East India as well as his other activities was recognised and he was appointed a member of the State Board for Wildlife, the highest policy making official body on wildlife in 2003 by the Government of Assam. The Government of Assam has also made him members of two other high official bodies, the State Wetland Steering Committee in 2003 and State Pollution Control Board in 2008. Prior to that the Government of India made the Rhino Foundation for nature in North East India a member of the Indian Board for Wildlife in 1999, which was headed by the then Prime Minister of India Atal Behari Bajpayee.
He was one of early members of the World Wide Fund for Nature (formerly called the World Wildlife Fund), and the Bombay Natural History Society in North-East India (since 1981) and has actively contributed towards their activities in this region including wildlife surveys, awareness and identification of Important Bird Areas.

Conservation career
Dr Choudhury is a member of as many as eight IUCN/SSC/BLI Specialist Groups, which in itself is a major conservation achievement. He is a member of IUCN/SSC Asian Elephant, Asian Rhino, Asian Wild Cattle, Bear, Cat Specialist Groups, and IUCN/SSC/BLI Waterbird and Galliformes Specialist Groups. In addition he is a member of IUCN/SSC Primate Specialist Group's South Asian Network and was also with IUCN/SSC Conservation Breeding and Small Carnivore Specialist Groups. Choudhury is also member of International Asiatic Black Bear, Sun Bear and Sloth Bear Expert Groups. In the 1980s and 1990s, he went to the remote Himalayan region in Arunachal Pradesh and Bhutan, and to the mountainous regions of Nagaland, Manipur and Mizoram, which are occupied by people of the Tibetan-Burman and Tibeto-Chinese  ethnicity and who heavily supplement their income by hunting wildlife (except Bhutan). Choudhury was there to study the vanishing wildlife as well as motivating the people for conservation with various amounts of success.

Conservation results
Choudhury's work in conservation has resulted in the protection of a large number of areas in the North-East India, more particularly Assam. Due to his work, more than 15 wildlife sanctuaries have been established, including Bordoibam-Bilmukh, Pani-Dihing, Barail, Bherjan-Borajan-Podumoni, Dihing-Patkai, Hollongapar Gibbon, Nambor-Doigrung, Nambor, East Karbi Anglong, North Karbi Anglong, Amchang, Marat Longri, Barak-Bhuban and Narpuh; and two elephant reserves, the Dhansiri-Lungding and Dihing-Patkai. He was also instrumental in upgrading Dibru-Saikhowa into a national park, inclusion of Laokhowa and Burhachapori Sanctuaries in Kaziranga Tiger Reserve and declaration of the white-winged wood duck as the state bird of Assam. He is among very few fortunate scientists who could implement their own scientific/conservation recommendations later on as a bureaucrat. Many of the above have been officially notified and gazetted by himself as the Deputy Secretary and later as Joint Secretary to the Government in Environment & Forest Department. He was also a key member of the Assam Forest Policy Drafting Committee.

His writings in the 1980s also resulted in shelving of a railway project through the southern edge of world-famous Kaziranga National Park and World Heritage Site.

Other contributions
As a bureaucrat, Anwaruddin Choudhury was influential in ensuring a rural district of Assam to start e-governance giving transparency to the rural poor. He also took active part and partially succeeded in reducing social murders in the name of witch-hunting in remote areas such as Baksa district at the edge of Eastern Himalaya in Assam.
Dr. Choudhury's influence helped save many protected areas in North-East India from environmentally destructive developmental projects. The diversion of a National Highway from Manas National Park and Tiger Reserve near Koklabari and a power line from Dulung Reserved Forest are recent examples. He always spoken against such projects including mega dams.

Publications and Writing
Anwaruddin Choudhury has written 28 books and monographs, and more than 50 technical reports on the birds and mammals of North East India based on his own studies, and supported by long-term observations (list below). He has also written more than 900 articles and scientific papers about wildlife and conservation. He has published significant number of articles and papers in prestigious journals such as 88 articles starting from 1988 in Journal of Bombay Natural History Society, 14 articles starting from 1987 in Oryx (UK), 21 articles starting from 1983 in Tigerpaper (Thailand), 19 articles starting from 1991 in Newsletter for Birdwatchers, 18 articles starting from 2006 in Indian Birds, 15 and 18 articles respectively starting from 1991 each in Forktail journal (UK) and BirdingAsia, 74 articles starting from 1996 in Journal & Newsletter of the Rhino Foundation, 22 articles starting from 2000 in Mistnet, 19 articles starting from 1982 in Sanctuary Asia, 17 articles starting from 1996 in Environ. In addition he also published in Folia Parimatologica (Switzerland), American Journal of Primatology, Primate conservation (both in USA), Journal of Tropical Ecology (UK), Primate Report (Germany), Danphe (Nepal), Pachyderm (Kenya) among others. Nearly four decades, Choudhury's field research has helped shape wildlife protection efforts in India more particularly in North-East India.
Many of Choudhury's books continue to be references for the study of birds and mammals in North-East India. He is the author of:

Books and monographs authored
	Checklist of the Birds of Assam, Guwahati: Sofia Pub. (1990)
	A Naturalist in Karbi Anglong, Guwahati: Gibbon Books (1993,2009)
	Checklist of the Mammals of Assam, Guwahati: Gibbon Books (1994)
	Survey of White-winged Wood Duck and Bengal Florican, Guwahati: Rhino Foundation (1996)
	Checklist of the Mammals of Assam, rev.2nd edn.,Guwahati: Gibbon Books (1997)
	The Birds of Assam, Guwahati: Gibbon Books & WWF (2000)
	A Pocket Guide to the Birds of Nagaland, Guwahati : Gibbon Books & Rhino Foundation (2003)
	Birds of Kaziranga National Park : a checklist, Guwahati : Gibbon Books & Rhino Foundation (2003)
	The Mammals of Arunachal Pradesh, New Delhi: Regency Pub.(2004)
	Kaziranga : wildlife in Assam, Delhi: Rupa & Co.(2004)
	A Pocket Guide to the Birds of Arunachal Pradesh, Guwahati : Gibbon Books & Rhino Foundation (supported by OBC, UK; 2006)
	Birds of Manas National Park, Guwahati : Gibbon Books & Rhino Foundation (2006)
	Birds of Dibru-Saikhowa National Park, Guwahati : Gibbon Books & Rhino Foundation (2007)
	A Pocket Guide to the Birds of Mizoram, Guwahati : Gibbon Books & Rhino Foundation (supported by OBC, UK; 2008)
	A Naturalist in Karbi Anglong, rev. 2nd edn., Guwahati: Gibbon Books (2009)
   The Vanishing herds: the wild water buffalo, Guwahati : Gibbon Books & Rhino Foundation (supported by COA, Taiwan and CEPF/ATREE).
   The secrets of wild Assam, Guwahati: Bhabani Books (2012)
   The threatened birds of Assam, Mumbai: BNHS & Oxford Univ. Press (supported by CEPF/ATREE and BirdLife Int., Cambridge)[jointly    with A.R.Rahmani]. 
   The mammals of North East India, Guwahati : Gibbon Books & Rhino Foundation (supported by COA, Taiwan; 2013)
   A Pocket Guide to the Birds of Meghalaya. Guwahati : Gibbon Books & Rhino Foundation (supported by OBC, UK; 2014).
   The mammals of India, Guwahati : Gibbon Books & Rhino Foundation (supported by COA, Taiwan; 2016)
   Manas India's threatened World Heritage, Guwahati : Gibbon books & Rhino Foundation (2019)

Technical Studies and Reports
	Primates of Assam : their Distribution, Habitat and Status. Ph.D. thesis. Gauhati Univ. (1989).
	A Report on Bird Survey in Dibru-Saikhowa Wildlife Sanctuary, Assam, India. Report to the Oriental Bird Club, UK. (1994).
	Proposed Oil Field Nature Reserve, Digboi. The Rhino Foundation for Nature in NE India & WWF-India NE Region, Guwahati. (1996).
	Survey of Primates in some parts of eastern and central Assam. Final Report to ASTEC (Assam Science Tech. & Environment Council), Guwahati. (1996).
	A collaborative study on Gaurs (Bos gaurus) in North Bengal, West Bengal, India. with S. Bhattacharyya & G. Biswas).WWF-India Eastern Region, Calcutta. (1997).
	Survey of grasslands in some parts of central and southern Assam : to assess their bio-diversity & socio-economic problem. WWF-India NE Regional Office, Guwahati. Final Report to WWF-India, New Delhi (a BCPP). (1997).
	Conservation Strategy for the Indian rhinoceros and Asian elephant in NE India. Asian Rhino & Elephant Conservation Strategy (AREAS). Final Report & Project proposals to WWF-India, New Delhi. (1999).
	The birds of Eaglenest and Sessa Orchid Sanctuaries, Arunachal Pradesh. Final Report to Oriental Bird Club, UK. (2000)
	Survey of birds in Sangti-Shergaon-Kalaktang areas of West Kameng district, Arunachal Pradesh. BildLife International, The Royal Society for the Protection of  Birds, Wild Bird Federation Taiwan and Bombay Natural History Society (2001).
	A systematic review of the mammals of North-East India with special reference to the non-human primates. D.Sc.Thesis. Gauhati Univ. (2001).
	Major inland wetlands of North-Eastern India. A report submitted to SACON, Coimbatore. (2002).
	Survey of Mrs Hume's Pheasant in NE India. Report No. 5. The Rhino Foundation for nature in NE India, Guwahati [final report to OBC, UK]. (2002).
	Biodiversity survey in the upper areas of East Kameng district, Arunachal Pradesh. WWF-India Assam & Arunachal Office, Guwahati. (2002).
	The red panda - status and conservation. In 'Biodiversity 'Hiotspots' Conservation Programme (BHCP). Final report 1992–2002.  132–168. WWF- India, New Delhi. (2003).
	Survey of birds in Mechuka-Monigong-Jorgging areas of West and Upper Siang districts, Arunachal Pradesh. Bildlife International, The Royal Society for the Protection of  Birds, Wild Bird Federation Taiwan and Bombay Natural History Society. (2003).
	Awareness for bird conservation in Nagaland in north-eastern India. Final Report to the Oriental Bird Club, UK. (2004).
	A survey of animal use extraction pattern in some areas of Indian Himalayas.: Nagaland and Arunachal Pradesh. with KT Thomas Rengma. WPA- India, Guwahati (2005).
	Survey and monitoring of nesting sites of Gyps vultures in Assam, India. Withb K. Lahkar and R. Risebrough. The  Rhino  Foundation  for  nature  in  NE India  and  Department of Environment & Forests, Government of Assam, Guwahati, India. (2005).
	Census of Wild Water Buffalo in Laokhowa and Burhachapori Wildlife sanctuaries. With B.S. Bonal and C. Muthukumarvel. The Environment & Forest                      Department and The Rhino Foundation for nature in NE India, Guwahati. (2008).
	Census of Wild Water Buffalo in Manas National Park. With A. Swargiary, C.R. Bhobora and B. Saikia. The Field Directorate, Manas National Park, Barpeta Road and The Rhino Foundation for nature in NE India, Guwahati. (2008).
	Census of WildWater Buffalo in Dibru-Saikhowa National Park. With A. Dey. The Environment & Forest Department and The Rhino Foundation for nature in NE India, Guwahati. (2008).
       Survey of mammals and birds in Dibang-Dihang Biosphere Reserve, Arunachal Pradesh. Final Report to Ministry of Env. & Forests, Govt. of India. The Rhino Foundation for nature in NE India. Guwahati, India. 70pp.(2008).
       Records of  Sloth Bear and Malayan Sun Bear in North East India. Final report to International Association for Bear Research & Management (IBA). The Rhino Foundation for nature in NE India, Guwahati, Assam, India. Pp. 53.(2011).
       Records of  Asiatic Black Bear in North East India. Final report to International Association for Bear Research & Management (IBA). The Rhino Foundation for nature in NE India, Guwahati, Assam, India. Pp. 00.(2013).
       Camera trapping for wildlife with special reference to Small Mammals in parts of Arunachal Pradesh, Assam, Meghalaya, and Mizoram in North East India. Technical Report No. 17, The Rhino Foundation for nature in NE India, Guwahati, Assam, India. Pp. 62. (2014).
 Conservation of migratory Amur Falcons Falco amurensis in Assam. Final Report. The Rhino Foundation for nature in NE India & ONGC, Guwahati, Assam. 40pp. (2020).
 Habitat management in rhino-bearing areas of Assam. A preliminary report. A report submitted to Environment & Forest dept., Govt. of Assam, Guwahati. (2021).
 Planning a Protected Area Network in Assam. A report submitted to the Chief Minister of Assam, Guwahati. (2021).

Awards
Choudhury's honours include:
 Gold medal for M.A. by Gauhati University, 1985 
 Medal of the North-East India Geographical Society for securing 1st position in Geography in B.A. (honours), 1980
 Forktail-Leica Award for Mrs Hume's pheasant study by the Oriental Bird Club,
 OBC-WildWings Conservation Award, UK for conservation activities in Nagaland, 
 Community Leadership Award (environment) of ERD (Education, Research & Development) Foundation, Guwahati, 2013,
 Lifetime Achievement Award at the 10th edition of NatWest Group (formerly Royal bank of Scotland) Earth Heroes Awards 2020, 
 Sanctuary Lifetime Service Award 2021, 
 Eastern Himalaya Conservation Award of Balipara Foundation 2013, 
 True Legend Award of the Telegraph Group 2015, 
 Lifetime Achievement Award 2022 of Kaziranga Wildlife Society, 
 Census Medal 1991 and 2011 by Government of India, and 
 various prizes for drawings in B.Borooah College and Gauhati University.

References 

1959 births
Living people
Indian naturalists
Indian ornithologists
Indian mammalogists
Scientists from Meghalaya
20th-century Indian zoologists
21st-century Indian zoologists
People associated with Shillong